Douglas Kennedy may refer to:

Douglas Kennedy (politician) (1916–2003), Canadian politician
Douglas Kennedy (writer) (born 1955), American writer
Douglas Kennedy (actor) (1915–1973), American actor
Douglas Harriman Kennedy (born 1967), American broadcast journalist, son of Robert F. Kennedy
Douglas Kennedy (folk dancer), English folk musician and dancer